Hlengiwe Octavia Mkhaliphi (née Hlophe-Maxon) is a South African politician who has been serving as a Member of the National Assembly  since May 2014. Mkhaliphi is a founding member of the Economic Freedom Fighters and served as the party's inaugural deputy secretary-general from 2014 until 2019.

Education
Mkhaliphi received a Bachelor of Administration Honours in Public Administration from the University of South Africa in April 2019.

Political career
Mkhaliphi is a founding member of the Economic Freedom Fighters, a party that was established in July 2013 and is currently led by Julius Malema. She was elected as one of the party's first parliamentarians in May 2014. In December of that same year, she was elected as the party's inaugural deputy secretary-general.

Mkhaliphi returned to Parliament following the 2019 general election. At the party's December conference, she was nominated for a second term as deputy secretary-general, but she declined the nomination. Poppy Mailola was elected to succeed her.

Personal life
Mkhaliphi married in October 2016. The party's Twitter account tweeted about it with "#revolutionarywedding".

References

External links
Profile at Parliament of South Africa

Living people
Year of birth missing (living people)
21st-century South African politicians
21st-century South African women politicians
Economic Freedom Fighters politicians
Members of the National Assembly of South Africa
Women members of the National Assembly of South Africa